SOFA Statistics is an open-source statistical package.  The name stands for Statistics Open For All.  It has a graphical user interface and can connect directly to MySQL, PostgreSQL, SQLite, MS Access (map), and Microsoft SQL Server.  Data can also be imported from CSV and Tab-Separated files or spreadsheets (Microsoft Excel, OpenOffice.org Calc, Gumeric, Google Docs). The main statistical tests available are Independent and Paired t-tests, Wilcoxon signed ranks, Mann–Whitney U, Pearson's chi squared, Kruskal Wallis H, one-way ANOVA, Spearman's R, and Pearson's R. Nested tables can be produced with row and column percentages, totals, standard deviation, mean, median, lower and upper quartiles, and sum.

Installation packages are available for several Operating Systems such as Microsoft Windows, Ubuntu, Arch Linux, Linux Mint, and macOS (Leopard upwards).

SOFA Statistics is written in Python, and the widget toolkit used is WxPython.  The statistical analyses are based on functions available through the SciPy stats module.

Statistics Features - Workflows 
Users are guided through the selection of the appropriate basic statistical methods and assignment of the basic statistical on the table column of the data that should be analyzed. 
The features available within SOFA for statistical analysis are limited compared to those found in Open Source R Statistics Software, which contains a large repository of statistics packages.

See also

 Comparison of statistical packages
 List of statistical packages
 List of open-source software for mathematics

References

External links
SOFA Statistics Homepage
SOFA Statistics project page at Source Forge
SOFA Statistics project page at Launchpad
SOFA Statistics page at Show Me Do

Cross-platform free software
Cross-platform software
Free statistical software
Numerical software
Science software for Linux
Science software for macOS
Science software for Windows
Software that uses wxPython
Software using the GNU AGPL license